Plasau Duon or Plasauduon is a  timber-framed house,  formerly in the parish of  Carno, but now within the area of the community council of Caersws in the historic county of Montgomeryshire, and  now in Powys, Wales. It  is located on a site above the left bank of the Afon Carno, on a farm road leading off the lane from the A.470 to Bwlch-y-garreg.  It is a fine example of a ‘’Severn Valley’’  house and has a Grade II* listing.  It is likely to have been built in the second half of the 16th. century.

History
The Welsh Herald Lewys  Dunn recorded in the mid-17th century the ancestors of the Evans family who were living at Plasau Duon.
Lewis Evans is known to have been living in 1631 It is likely that it was his grandfather (Howell ap Rhydderch) or great-grandfather (Rhydderch ap Llewelyn) were the builders of the original house. By 1904 Plasau Duon had passed to  Miss Mytton, the daughter of the Rev Devereux Mytton of Llandyssil.

Architecture
The house is of the ‘’Severn Valley’’ type, with a storied porch opposite the main back-to-back central fireplace, the hall on the right, and parlour on the left. A rear wing containing the stair, with side lean-to, added later, appears to replace an earlier wing. The Cadw listing considers that the house was built around 1660, but the dating by dendrochronlogy of other similar Montgomeryshire houses with jettied first floors, such Great Cefnyberen and Glas Hirfryn suggest that Plasau Duon could have been built up to a hundred years earlier.

Interior

The hall has a fine ceiling divided into nine square bays with chamfered and label stopped beams and exposed joists. There are dragon beams to the corners supporting the jettied upper floor.  There is a large inglenook fireplace with carved arcaded panelling  with coat-of arms above. To the left is a  carved 17th-century screen which opens to the entrance lobby. Its notable 17th-century floor (beneath modern boards) is of small smooth stones set in earth in geometrical patterns, a technique then widespread in the Trefeglwys and  Llanidloes areas  There is a similar ceiling in the parlour, divided into six  bays, and later wainscott and overmantle. In the extension, at the rear  is an oak  staircase of box type, with moulded handrail and balusters,  and built-in 17th-century  cupboards.

Outside
The building is two storied with an attic and slate roof. Plain stone chimney of untypical form. The timber-framed construction has  close studding to the ground floor, and square timber-framing.  The upper storey of the porch has bold diamond framing which is similar to Glas Hirfryn and Rhydycarw in Trefeglwys. The porch is off-centre because the hall is twice as wide as the parlour.  The porch has depressed ogee inner and outer doorheads. There are turned balusters set into the sides of the porch and internal side seats. The older part of the house is jettied on three sides with ovolo and hollow moulded bressumers, and supported by brackets.

Literature
Davies A,(1903–4) 'The History of the Parish of Carno' Montgomeryshire Collections XXXIII., pp 169–170
Smith P and Owen CEV, 'Traditional and Renaissance Elements in some late Stuart and early Georgian Half-Timbered Houses in Arwystli' Montgomeryshire Collections LV–LVI. 1957–60, pp 101–124. Plan at Fig. 4 and photographs before restoration at Plate II;
Royal Commission on the Ancient and Historical Monuments of Wales, (1911), Inventory of the Ancient Monuments in Wales and Monmouth I – County of Montgomery.
Scourfield R.  and Haslam R. (2013), The Buildings of Wales: Powys; Montgomeryshire, Radnorshire and Breconshire, Yale University Press. pp101. 
Smith P.(1988, 2nd ed.), Houses of the Welsh Countryside, H.M.S.O.,pp 94–5, and maps 10, 19, 30, 33 and 39.
Suggett R and Stevenson G. (2010), Introducing Houses of the Welsh Countryside. Cyflwyno Cartrefi Cefn Gwlad Cymru. Y Lolfa/ RCAHMW.

References

See also: the following Montgomeryshire Timber-framed houses
Great Cefnyberen
Ty Mawr, Castle Caereinion 
Cilthriew, Kerry (Montgomeryshire)
Maesmawr Hall, Llandinam
Glas Hirfryn, Llansilin
Lymore, (Montgomery)

External links
Details on British Listed Buildings
Details on Coflein
Details of Plasau Duon on CPAT Archwilio

Country houses in Powys
Grade II* listed buildings in Powys
Timber-framed houses in Wales
Buildings and structures in Powys